Hauge is a common Norwegian surname, commonly associated with farms. The name Hauge derives from the  old Norse word haugr meaning hill, knoll, or mound. Derivatives also include Haugan and Haugen. Hauge may also refer to:

People
 Alfred Hauge (1876–1901), Norwegian painter
 Alfred Hauge (1915–1986), Norwegian historian and author
 Earl Hauge (born 1940), American politician and Lutheran minister
 Eivind Hiis Hauge (born 1937), Norwegian physicist 
 Frederic Hauge (born 1965), Norwegian environmental activist
 Gabriel Hauge (1914–1981), American bank executive, author and economist
 Hans Nielsen Hauge (1771–1824), Norwegian revivalist lay preacher
 Hans Nilsen Hauge (1853–1931), Norwegian politician
 Harald Hauge (born 1984), Norwegian football defender 
 Jens Christian Hauge (1915–2006), Norwegian World War II resistance fighter and politician
 Jens Petter Hauge (born 1999), Norwegian footballer who plays for Eintracht Frankfurt
 Kjell Ove Hauge (born 1969), Norwegian shot putter and discus thrower
 Louis J. Hauge Jr. (1924–1945), United States Marine awarded the Medal of Honor posthumously 
 Marie Hauge (1864–1931), Norwegian painter
 Michael Hauge, American script consultant, screenwriter, author and lecturer
 Olav H. Hauge (1908–1994), Norwegian poet
 Oscar Hauge (1868–1945), American politician 
 Øystein Hauge (born 1956), Norwegian writer
 Ron Hauge, American television writer
 Rune Hauge (born 1954), Norwegian football agent
 Sjur Jarle Hauge (born 1971), Norwegian football coach
 Terje Hauge (born 1965), Norwegian football referee

Places
 Hauge, Denmark, a small village area in the city of Odense on the island of Funen in Denmark
 Hauge, Rogaland, the administrative centre of Sokndal municipality in Rogaland county, Norway
 Hauge, Østfold, a village in Hvaler municipality in Østfold county, Norway
 Hauge Church, a church in Lærdalsøyri in Lærdal municipality in Sogn og Fjordane county, Norway

Other
 Hauge Synod, Norwegian Lutheran church body in the United States named after Hans Nielsen Hauge
 Björn at Hauge, Swedish king during the first half of the 9th century.

Norwegian-language surnames